Adho Andha Paravai Pola is an unreleased Indian Tamil-language action adventure film directed by Vinoth K. R. in his directorial debut, written by Arun Rajagopalan starring Amala Paul, Ashish Vidyarthi and Samir Kochhar. Jakes Bejoy composed the film's music, while it is edited by John Abraham JR. The title of the film is taken from a song from the 1965 film Aayirathil Oruvan.

Cast
 Amala Paul
 Ashish Vidyarthi
 Samir Kochhar
 Supreme Sundhar

Production
The film was announced in March 2017 with Amala Paul in the lead role. The title and the first look of the film was revealed on the International Women's Day of 2018 by Kajal Agarwal. During filming in August 2018, Amala Paul suffered a serious ligament tear while performing an action sequence and resumed shooting after recovery.

Release 
Originally the film was scheduled to release on 27 December 2019 and later on 28 February 2020. After two years of deadlock, the film was scheduled to release on 26 August 2022, before being delayed again.

References

External links

Unreleased Tamil-language films
Indian action adventure films